High Newton is a village in the South Lakeland district, in the county of Cumbria, England.

By-pass 
Formerly, the village  was bisected by the A590 road until a bypass of the village and its neighbour Low Newton was completed. It opened on Tuesday 8 April 2008.

Nearby settlements  
Nearby settlements include the town of Grange-over-Sands, the villages of Lindale, Low Newton and Newby Bridge and the hamlets of Ayside, Field Broughton and Barber Green.

See also

Listed buildings in Lindale and Newton-in-Cartmel

References

External links
 Cumbria County History Trust: Upper Allithwaite (nb: provisional research only – see Talk page)

Villages in Cumbria
South Lakeland District